Anatoliy Volodymyrovych Skorokhod (September 10, 1930January 3, 2011) was a Soviet and Ukrainian mathematician. 

Skorokhod is well-known for a comprehensive treatise on the theory of stochastic processes, co-authored with Gikhman.
In the words of mathematician and probability theorist Daniel W. Stroock “Gikhman and Skorokhod have done an excellent job of presenting the theory in its present state of rich imperfection.”

Career
Skorokhod worked at Kyiv University from 1956 to 1964. He was subsequently at the Institute of Mathematics of the National Academy of Sciences of Ukraine from 1964 until 2002. Since 1993, he had been a professor at Michigan State University in the US, and a member of the American Academy of Arts and Sciences.

He was an academician of the National Academy of Sciences of Ukraine from 1985 to his death in 2011.

His scientific works are on the theory of:
 stochastic differential equations,
 limit theorems of random processes,
 distributions in infinite-dimensional spaces,
 statistics of random processes and Markov processes.

Skorokhod authored over 450 scientific works, including more than 40 monographs and books.

Many terms and concepts have his name, including:
 Skorokhod's embedding theorem
 Skorokhod integral
 Skorokhod's representation theorem
 Skorokhod space
 Skorokhod problem

Selected works
with I. I. Gikhman: Introduction to the theory of random processes, W. B. Saunders 1969, Dover 1996
with I. I. Gikhman: Stochastic Differential Equations, Springer Verlag 1972
with I. I. Gikhman: Controlled stochastic processes, Springer Verlag 1979
with I. I. Gikhman: The Theory of Stochastic Processes, Springer Verlag, 3 vols., 2004–2007
Random processes with independent increments, Kluwer 1991
Asymptotic methods in the theory of stochastic differential equations , American Mathematical Society 1989
Random linear operators, Reidel 1984
Studies in the theory of random processes, Dover 1982
Stochastic equations for complex systems, Reidel/Kluwer 1988 
Stochastische Differentialgleichungen, Berlin, Akademie Verlag 1971
Integration in Hilbert Space, Springer Verlag 1974
with Yu. V. Prokhorov: Basic principles and applications of probability theory, Springer Verlag 2005
with Frank C. Hoppensteadt, Habib Salehi: Random perturbation methods with applications in science and engineering, Springer Verlag 2002

See also
 List of Ukrainian mathematicians

Notes

External links
 
 
 
 

Ukrainian mathematicians
Soviet mathematicians
20th-century American mathematicians
21st-century American mathematicians
Ukrainian expatriates in the United States
1930 births
2011 deaths
Michigan State University faculty
Probability theorists
Laureates of the State Prize of Ukraine in Science and Technology
Mathematical statisticians